The 2012–13 UCF Knights men's basketball team represented the University of Central Florida during the 2012–13 college basketball season. The Knights competed in Division I of the National Collegiate Athletic Association (NCAA) and Conference USA (C-USA). The Knights, in the program's 44th season of basketball, were led by third-year head coach Donnie Jones, and played their home games at the UCF Arena on the university's main campus in Orlando, Florida.

Due to NCAA sanctions, UCF was ineligible for the 2013 Conference USA men's basketball tournament or a post-season berth. This was also the last season UCF played in Conference USA before moving to the American Athletic Conference.

They finished the season 20–11, 9–7 in C-USA play to finish in a tie for fourth place.

Previous season
In the previous year, the Knights finished the season 22–11, 10–6 in C-USA play. UCF was invited to the 2012 National Invitation Tournament, which they lost in the first round to Drexel.

Pre-season

Departures

Class of 2012 signees

Roster

Schedule and results

|-
!colspan=9| Regular season
|-

References

UCF Knights men's basketball seasons
Ucf
UCF Knights
UCF Knights